Pihalla is a 2009 Finnish film directed by Toni Laine. The release date for the film was 23 October 2009.

References

External links
 
 

2009 films
2000s Finnish-language films
2000s German-language films
Finnish drama films
2000s English-language films
2009 multilingual films
Finnish multilingual films